The Annals of Oncology is a peer-reviewed medical journal of oncology, published by Elsevier. It is the official journal of the European Society for Medical Oncology. The editor-in-chief is Fabrice André (Villejuif, France). Previous editors were Jean-Charles Soria, Jan Vermorken, David J. Kerr and Franco Cavalli.

Some articles are available for free public access.

Before coming to Elsevier the journal was published by Oxford University Press, and Springer.

References

External links 
 

Oncology journals
Oxford University Press academic journals
Publications established in 1990
Hybrid open access journals
Monthly journals
English-language journals